Death can occur during sexual intercourse for a number of reasons, generally because of the physical strain of the activity, or because of unusual extenuating circumstances. There are various euphemisms for death during sex, including "dying in the saddle" or the French "la mort d'amour".

Health and physiology
Sexual intimacy, as well as orgasms, increases levels of the hormone oxytocin, also known as "the love hormone", which helps people bond and build trust. Sexual activity is also known as one of many mood repair strategies, which means it can be used to help dissipate feelings of sadness or depression.

A 2011 meta-analysis in the Journal of the American Medical Association found that each additional hour of sexual activity per week resulted in an increased risk of 2–3 myocardial infarctions and one sudden cardiac death per 10,000 person-years. Sexual intercourse can also trigger a subarachnoid hemorrhage via the Valsalva maneuver. A 2011 meta-analysis published in Journal of Sexual Medicine found that men who were unfaithful were significantly more likely than those who were faithful to experience severe or fatal cardiac events during sex. Basilar artery dissection has also been reported in connection with sexual activity, though most coital cephalalgia is benign in nature.

Deaths during consensual sex only account for approximately 0.6% of all sudden deaths. Sildenafil, although generally considered to be a safe drug, has been linked to sudden cardiovascular death during sexual activity among elderly or otherwise infirm men. The majority of deaths due to cardiovascular causes during sex do occur in males. A number of deaths during consensual sex have been linked to the use of other prescription or recreational drugs, such as cocaine.

The heart condition endothelial dysfunction is a contributing cause to both atherosclerosis and erectile dysfunction. Because of the link between these conditions, rates of coronary heart disease are higher among patients with erectile dysfunction. One treatment for erectile dysfunction is cGMP-specific phosphodiesterase type 5 inhibitors, which enable patients to resume having sex despite having a cardiac condition, by lowering blood pressure. These drugs, including sildenafil, inhibit the action of the phosphodiesterase, allowing for a higher concentration of cyclic GMP in the penis when it is physically stimulated. Cyclic GMP is a second messenger in the nitric oxide pathway, responsible for erections via the vasodilating function of nitric oxide. Sudden cardiac death can be caused by myocardial ischemia, and the physical activity of sexual intercourse in patients with coronary artery disease can result in myocardial ischemia. The phosphodiesterase can act as a potentiator for other drugs which lower blood pressure and which could be used to treat heart conditions, and so may be contraindicated to prevent negative health consequences.

Notable cases

Attila died in March 453; supposed to have died in the process of celebrating his wedding night with his new bride Ildico, from a nosebleed.
 Pope John XII died on 14 May 964; one story relates that he died of a paralytic stroke suffered while having sex with a woman named Stefanetta. He may have died instead when the woman's husband defenestrated John or beat him to death with a hammer during the act.
 Lord Palmerston, Prime Minister of the United Kingdom, died in 1865 following a brief illness; sources disagree about the immediate circumstances of his death. It is rumored that sex on a billiard table with a maid precipitated his demise, but this account is disputed, with other sources stating that he died of pneumonia.
 Félix Faure, president of France from 1895 to 1899, is widely reported to have died while receiving fellatio from his mistress, Marguerite Steinheil.  The cause of death was listed as a cerebral hemorrhage. Eyewitnesses stated he was in a state of partial undress. This version is disputed by some historians.
 Cardinal Jean Daniélou, a prolific and renowned Jesuit theologian, died in 1974 inside a Paris brothel at 69 years of age. Although the prostitute he was visiting said he was delivering charity, this account was not believed by some.
 Sir Billy Snedden, Australian politician and former leader of the Liberal Party,  "expired 'at the peak of physical congress' (as a policeman told Truth)" in 1987. Nineteen years later, his son (and lover of the same woman with whom Snedden was having sex at the time of his death) was quoted as saying "I'm sure the old man went out happy—anyone would be proud to die on the job."
 Nelson Rockefeller, former Vice President of the United States and heir to the Rockefeller family fortune, died in 1979 of a heart attack at age 70, rumored to be caused by an orgasm during intercourse with his secretary, Megan Marshack. The unusual circumstances surrounding his death caused New York magazine to quip, "Nelson thought he was coming, but he was going". Contemporaneous accounts of his death differed greatly and his hasty cremation left the exact cause of death uncertain.
 Japanese writer Isamu Togawa had heart failure in 1983 due to his chronic arrhythmia; according to Taro Maki, Togawa died during sexual intercourse at his hotel room. Togawa's younger brother Itaru Kikumura also said that Togawa died during sex, though this was denied by Tsuneo Watanabe.
 On November 23, 1983, James "Jimmy the Beard" Ferrozzo, a longtime employee of the Condor, the San Francisco topless club made famous by Carol Doda, was killed at the age of 40 while having sex with his girlfriend, Theresa Hill, on top of the club's piano when the couple inadvertently triggered the piano's elevator mechanism trapping him between Hill and the ceiling.
 A woman from Houston died in 1997 after she fell from a balcony in Los Angeles during sex with her employer.
 In Romania in 1999, two men died of carbon monoxide poisoning while having sex in a car which they had parked in a garage with the engine still running.
 In 2007, a man and woman, both 21, were discovered naked on an empty street in Columbia, South Carolina, with multiple injuries resulting from a fall. Their clothes were later found on the roof of a four-story building adjacent to the road. Both died in hospital after falling  from the downtown Columbia building.
 A York County, Pennsylvania, woman died in 2008 when she was electrocuted by homemade nipple clamps, an example of an erotic electrostimulation practice. Her death was ruled a homicide.
An Atlanta Police Department officer died in 2009 from atheroschlerotic coronary artery disease while engaged in a threesome.  His widow sued his doctor and was awarded a $3 million settlement, with the jury finding that the doctor did not properly diagnose and treat the police officer's pre-existing health issues.
 In 2013, a man and woman in Zimbabwe were having sex outdoors when they were attacked by a lion; the woman died.
 In 2018, a 29-year-old prostitute died in Saint Petersburg, Russia, after choking on a condom while performing fellatio on a man. The condom slipped off the client during the act and blocked the prostitute's airways.
 In August 2020, a 35-year-old man collapsed and died in the company of a prostitute in Phalombe, Malawi. Local police, and later the general practitioner of the nearby Migowi health centre examined his body, and determined the cause of death to be "excessive orgasm which caused blood vessels in the brain to rupture". Police said the sex worker would not be prosecuted, because she "committed no crime by being too sweet for the man".

See also
Autoerotic fatality
Accidental deaths during erotic asphyxiation
Rough sex murder defense
List of unusual deaths

References

Human sexuality
Lists of people by cause of death
Lists of things considered unusual